Buloba is an urban area in Wakiso District in the Buganda Region of Uganda. The area is primarily a middle-class residential neighborhood.

Location

Buloba is on the tarmacked Kampala–Mityana Road. The coordinates of Buloba Main, immediately north of Buloba Police Station are 0°19'30.0"N, 32°27'26.0"E (Latitude:0.325000; Longitude:32.457222).

Overview
The neighborhood of Buloba has an estimated size of 1,295 hectares (3,200 acres) or 13 km2.

When the Uganda Oil Refinery is built, it is anticipated that Hoima–Kampala Petroleum Products Pipeline, the refined petroleum products will be piped to a location near Buloba, for distribution within Kampala and other towns such as Entebbe.

Points of interest
Buloba Police Station, an establishment of the Uganda Police Force, is located in "Buloba Main". Health facilities include Buloba Health Centre and Lynaset Health Care Services.

The neighborhood also hosts Buloba High School, Buloba Teacher's Training College, Buloba Vocational Institute and a campus of Africa Renewal University. Kasero Church of Uganda and St. Peter Catholic Church are also located here.

References

External links
  Government To Construct Oil Storage Facility In Buloba

Wakiso District
Populated places in Central Region, Uganda